Nomophila corticalis is a moth of the family Crambidae. It is known from Christmas Island and most of Australia, including the Australian Capital Territory, New South Wales, Queensland, South Australia and Victoria.

The wingspan is about 20 mm. Adults have wings with variable brown splotches.

The larvae have been reared on leaves of Fabaceae, Asteraceae and Polygonaceae species. Young larvae are gregarious, living in a nest of leaves joined with silk. Later instars make holes in the ground lined with silk in which to live. They emerge at night to feed.

References

Moths described in 1869
Spilomelinae
Taxa named by Francis Walker (entomologist)